Helen Johnsson (born 18 October 1976) is a Swedish ten-pin bowler. She finished in 6th position of the combined rankings at the 2006 AMF World Cup. During the final round she finished in 2nd position.

References

Living people
1976 births
Swedish ten-pin bowling players
Place of birth missing (living people)
21st-century Swedish women